Cerithiopsilla is a genus of  very small sea snails, marine gastropod molluscs in the family Cerithiopsidae. It was described by Thiele in 1912.

Species
 Cerithiopsilla antarctica (Smith, 1907)
 Cerithiopsilla austrina (Hedley, 1911)
 Cerithiopsilla bisculpta (Strebel, 1908)
 Cerithiopsilla burdwoodiana (Melvill & Standen, 1912)
 Cerithiopsilla charcoti (Lamy, 1906)
 Cerithiopsilla cincta Thiele, 1912
 Cerithiopsilla gaussiana Egorova, 1972
 Cerithiopsilla georgiana (Pfeffer, 1886)
 Cerithiopsilla liouvillei (Lamy, 1910)

References

Cerithiopsidae